Ikromjon Alibaev (Uzbek Cyrillic: Икромжон Алибаев; born 9 January 1994) is an Uzbek international footballer who plays for Gangwon FC and the Uzbekistan national team as a midfielder.

Club career

Lokomotive Tashkent
Alibaev debuted for the senior team of Lokomotiv Tashkent on 8 November 2013, in a league match against FK Buxoro.

FC Seoul
On 13 December 2018, he signed a three-year contract with the K League 1 side FC Seoul. He had contributed the club to reach the third place of the league table and 2020 AFC Champions League, but had to be out for season due to the injury during the 2020 season.

Daejeon Hana Citizen
In 2021, Alibaev terminated his contract with FC Seoul through a mutual consent and then joinedK League 2 side Daejeon Hana Citizen. He then left the club at the end of the season.

Pakhtakor Tashkent FK
In 2022, he returned to Uzbekistan and joined Pakhtakor Tashkent FK.

International career
After being called by then national team coach, Mirjalol Qosimov, Alibaev played his first match for Uzbekistan senior team in a friendly match against Iran on 11 July 2015.

Honours

Club
Lokomotiv Tashkent
 Uzbekistan Super League (3): 2016, 2017, 2018
 Uzbekistan Cup (3): 2014, 2016, 2017
 Uzbekistan Super Cup (1): 2015

Notes

References

External links
 
 
 
 

1994 births
Living people
Sportspeople from Tashkent
Uzbekistani footballers
Association football midfielders
Uzbekistan youth international footballers
Uzbekistan international footballers
PFC Lokomotiv Tashkent players
Uzbekistan Super League players
K League 1 players
K League 2 players
FC Seoul players
Daejeon Hana Citizen FC
Pakhtakor Tashkent FK players
Uzbekistani expatriate footballers
Uzbekistani expatriate sportspeople in South Korea
Expatriate footballers in South Korea
2015 AFC Asian Cup players
Footballers at the 2018 Asian Games
2019 AFC Asian Cup players
Asian Games competitors for Uzbekistan